Robert Philip Rowan (10 September 1870 – 19 June 1946) was an Irish Anglican priest. He was Dean of Ardfert from 1924 until 1946.

Rowan was educated at Trinity College, Dublin and  ordained in 1897. He began his ecclesiastical career with curacies at Tralee and Wexford. He was a chaplain to the forces at Curragh and Shorncliffe then senior curate  at St John's Lowestoft. After incumbencies in Castleisland, Kenmare and Killarney he was elevated to the Deanery. He was Archdeacon of Ardfert and Aghadoe and Canon of Effin from 1938 to 1943.

References

1870 births
Alumni of Trinity College Dublin
Irish military chaplains
Deans of Ardfert
Anglican archdeacons in Ireland
1946 deaths